Eurocom Corporation is a Canadian computer developer of high performance notebooks and laptops.

History

Eurocom was founded in 1989 as a company designing desktop replacement notebooks. To achieve this they used CPUs intended for desktop computers in their notebooks. In May 2013 Eurocom began to sell laptops through Future Shop's online retail store.

Background
Eurocom structures laptop design and building around units that it claims are "highly configurable and easily upgradable." Another Eurocom philosophy is "creating computers that push technology forward" and the company claims to have a series of industry firsts as a result.  Eurocom offers a series of specialized computers such as Trusted Platform Module notebooks, and Mobile Servers.
Eurocom has been awarded the "Intel Form Factor Solution Innovation Award"  In addition to other awards from various publications.

References

External links
Official website
Eurocom Europe

Canadian companies established in 1989
Companies based in Ottawa
Computer hardware companies
Electronics companies of Canada
Canadian brands